Bernard van der Linde (born 30 November 2000) is a South African rugby union player for the  in the Currie Cup. His regular position is scrum-half.

Van der Linde was named in the  side for the 2022 Currie Cup Premier Division.

References

South African rugby union players
Living people
Rugby union scrum-halves
Blue Bulls players
2000 births
Bulls (rugby union) players